Abu Simbel Airport  is a regional airport in Abu Simbel, Egypt. In 2011, it served 119,326 passengers (-75.6% vs. 2010).

Airlines and destinations

See also 
List of airports in Egypt

References

External links

 
 

Airports in Egypt